"Your Love (Means Everything to Me)" is a song written by Charles Wright and performed by Charles Wright & the Watts 103rd Street Rhythm Band. It reached #9 on the R&B chart and #73 on the Billboard Hot 100 in 1971.  The song was featured on their 1971 album, You're So Beautiful.

The song was produced by Wright and arranged by The Watts 103rd Street Band.

In popular culture
The band performed the song along with "Express Yourself" on season 1, episode 2 of the show Soul Train.

References

1971 songs
1971 singles
Charles Wright & the Watts 103rd Street Rhythm Band songs
Warner Records singles